The 2011–12 Liga Leumit was the thirteen season since its introduction in 1999 and the 70th season of second-tier football in Israel. It began on 19 August 2011 and ended on 18 May 2012.

A total of sixteen teams were contesting in the league, including twelfth sides from the 2010–11 season, two promoted teams from the 2010–11 Liga Alef and two relegated teams from the 2010–11 Israeli Premier League.

Changes from 2010–11 season

Structural changes
Only one team will be promoted to the 2012–13 Israeli Premier League, and three relegated teams from the Israeli Premier League.
Three team will be relegated to the 2012–13 Liga Alef, and only one will be promoted from Liga Alef.

Team changes

Ironi Ramat HaSharon and Hapoel Rishon LeZion were directly promoted to the 2011–12 Israeli Premier League after finishing the 2010–11 season in the two top places.

Hapoel Ashkelon and Hapoel Ramat Gan were directly relegated to the 2011–12 Liga Leumit after finishing the 2010–11 Israeli Premier League season in the two bottom places.

Overview

Stadia and locations

 The club is playing their home games at a neutral venue because their own ground does not meet Premier League requirements.

Regular season

Regular season table

Regular season results

Playoffs
Key numbers for pairing determination (number marks position after 30 games):

Top Playoff
The points obtained during the regular season were halved (and rounded up) before the start of the playoff. Thus, Hapoel Ramat Gan started with 30 points, Hapoel Bnei Lod with 30, Maccabi Ahi Nazareth with 25, Maccabi Herzliya with 25, Hapoel Ra'anana with 24, and Hapoel Jerusalem started with 22.

Top Playoff table

Top Playoff results

Promotion playoff
The 1st-placed team Hapoel Ramat Gan faced the 2nd-placed team Hapoel Bnei Lod. The winner Hapoel Ramat Gan earned a spot in the 2012–13 Israeli Premier League. The match took place on 18 May 2012.

Middle Playoff
The points obtained during the regular season were halved (and rounded up) before the start of the playoff. Thus, Maccabi Umm al-Fahm started with 22 points, Beitar Tel Aviv Ramla with 21, Hapoel Kfar Saba with 21, and Hapoel Ashkelon started with 20.

Middle Playoff table

Middle Playoff results

Bottom Playoff
The points obtained during the regular season were halved (and rounded up) before the start of the playoff. Thus, Sektzia Nes Tziona started with 20 points, Ironi Bat Yam with 16, Hakoah Ramat Gan with 16, Hapoel Nazareth Illit with 14, Maccabi Be'er Sheva with 13, and Hapoel Herzliya started with 11.

Bottom Playoff table

Bottom Playoff results

Top scorers

Season statistics

Scoring
First goal of the season:  Ibrahim Basit for Maccabi Umm al-Fahm against Hapoel Bnei Lod, 64th minute (19 August 2011)
Widest winning margin: 6 goals – Maccabi Ahi Nazareth 0–6 Hapoel Bnei Lod (11 May 2012)
Most goals in a match: 8 goals –
Maccabi Be'er Sheva 3–5 Hapoel Ashkelon (26 December 2011)
Beitar Tel Aviv Ramla 3–5 Hapoel Kfar Saba (14 April 2012)
Most goals in a half: 6 goals – Hapoel Bnei Lod 1–5 Maccabi Herzliya, 0–0 at half-time (4 May 2012)
Most goals in a match by one player: 3 goals –
 Ibrahim Basit for Maccabi Umm al-Fahm against Hapoel Bnei Lod (19 August 2011)
 Adam Mizrahi for Hapoel Jerusalem against Sektzia Nes Tziona (3 October 2011)
 Murad Abu Anza for Hapoel Bnei Lod against Hapoel Nazareth Illit (15 October 2011)
 Mati Avraham for Hapoel Jerusalem against Beitar Tel Aviv Ramla (18 November 2011)
 William Owusu for Hapoel Kfar Saba against Hapoel Nazareth Illit (21 November 2011)
 Murad Abu Anza for Hapoel Bnei Lod against Ironi Bat Yam (19 December 2011)
 Mor Shaked for Sektzia Nes Tziona against Hapoel Herzliya (9 March 2012)
 Ran Itzhak for Hapoel Kfar Saba against Hapoel Herzliya (30 March 2012)
 Yadin Zaris for Maccabi Herzliya against Hapoel Bnei Lod (4 May 2012)
 Yaniv Deri for Hapoel Nazareth Illit against Sektzia Nes Tziona (7 May 2012)

Discipline
First yellow card of the season:  Salach Haj for Maccabi Umm al-Fahm against Hapoel Bnei Lod, 28th minute (19 August 2011)
First red card of the season:  Yaniv Deri for Hapoel Nazareth Illit against Hapoel Ashkelon, 90th minute (27 August 2011)

See also
 2011–12 Israel State Cup
 2011–12 Toto Cup Leumit

References

2
Liga Leumit seasons
Israel Liga Leumit